Jen Sookfong Lee is a Chinese Canadian broadcaster and novelist. A radio personality for CBC Radio One in Vancouver, British Columbia, she contributes a regular literary segment called "Westcoast Words" to On the Coast and All Points West, the network's local programs in Vancouver and Victoria, and is also a regular contributor to the national network program The Next Chapter. In the CBC's national Canada Reads competition in 2009, she defended Brian Francis's novel Fruit.

Her published works include the novels The End of East (2007) and The Better Mother (2011), the young adult novel Shelter (2011), the non-fiction book Gentlemen of the Shade (2017), and the short story "Chill, Hush" in the anthology TOK: Writing the New City (2009).

Born and raised in East Vancouver, she and her son now live in North Burnaby.

She served on the jury for the 2011 Dayne Ogilvie Prize, a literary award for emerging LGBT writers in Canada, selecting Farzana Doctor as that year's winner.

References

External links
Jen Sookfong Lee
Random House Page for Jen Sookfong Lee

Living people
Canadian writers of Asian descent
21st-century Canadian novelists
Canadian women novelists
Canadian radio personalities
Canadian people of Chinese descent
Writers from Vancouver
Canadian women radio presenters
Canadian women short story writers
21st-century Canadian women writers
21st-century Canadian short story writers
1976 births